Shane Burcar is the current head coach of the Northern Arizona Lumberjacks men's basketball team.

Coaching career
Burcar began his coaching in the high school ranks, highlighted by a 12-year tenure as the head boys basketball coach at Mesa High School, where he compiled a 277–110 overall record with seven regular-season regional titles, and an Arizona Division I state title in 2016. In 2018, he joined Jack Murphy's staff at Northern Arizona. The following season when Murphy left the Lumberjacks for an assistant coaching position at Arizona, Burcar stepped in as the interim head coach for the 2019–20 season.

After guiding the team to a 16–14 record, Burcar was named the permanent head coach on March 25, 2020. Burcar served as NAU's interim head coach during the 2019–20 season and immediately led the Lumberjacks to their best campaign since 2014–15. The Lumberjacks finished 16-14 overall and 10–10 in conference play with both win totals serving as the program's most in five years. The 16 overall wins surpassed the program's combined total from the two previous seasons. Of 59 Division I programs that were led by new head coaches in 2019–20, NAU was in the top five in win improvement among programs that finished with a winning record as the 'Jacks went from 10 to 16 victories from 2018–19 to 2019–20. Nationally, the Lumberjacks' scoring offense rose from 330th to 157th (65.6 to 73.0) and they saw similar jumps of 100-plus spots in field goal percentage, three-point percentage, three-pointers per game, assists per game and assist-to-turnover ratio from the year prior. His success led him to being a finalist for the Joe B. Hall Award, presented annually to the top first-year coach in Division I college basketball.

Head coaching record

References

Living people
American men's basketball coaches
Basketball coaches from Michigan
Northern Arizona Lumberjacks men's basketball coaches
People from Hancock, Michigan
Ottawa University alumni
Year of birth missing (living people)